The Jordanian Southern Command (Arabic:المنطقة العسكرية الجنوبية) is the Jordanian Armed Forces regional command responsible for a large area in the Kingdom and defending 4 cities (Aqaba, Ma'an, Tafilah, Al Karak).

History 
Jordanian Southern Command is the smallest regional command in JAF, this command defend 4 cities and consist of one Armoured brigade, one infantry brigade and other support units.
In 2000 the King Abdullah II made a big step to modernize and restructure Jordanian Armed Forces when the Divisions have been transformed into a lighter, more mobile forces, based largely on a brigade structure and considered better capable of rapid reaction in emergencies.

A number of infantry battalions are normally assigned to defend Karak, located just to the east of the southern part of the Dead Sea, and Aqaba, the port city in the deep south of Jordan, near the border with Saudi Arabia. Some of the units based in the Aqaba area also have a coastal defence role.

Organisation 
The Southern Command controls regional units covering Aqaba, Ma'an, Tafilah & Al Karak. The head of Southern command is Brigadier General Hilal Abdul Halim Al-Khawaldeh.

Southern Command HQ 
 Command Staff
 HQ Defense Company
 Command Communication Battalion
 Command Military Police

Border Guard Force (BGF) 
 3rd Border Guard Force Group
 Group HQ
 Command Staff
 Signal Company 
 Medical Center
 Vehicles & Weapons Maintenance Workshop
 Reconnaissance & Surveillance Center 
 7th Border Guard Force Battalion
 8th Border Guard Force Battalion

Combat & Maneuver Units 
 Prince Zaid Bin Al Hussein 93rd Mechanized Infantry Brigade
 Brigade HQ
 Command Staff
 Joint Fires Coordination Cell - Targeting Cell
 Signal Company
 Medical Center 
 Vehicles & Weapons Maintenance Workshop
 Chemical Support Platoon (Attached)
 JTAC Team
 Martyr Abdelhamid Sharaf 41st Mechanized Infantry Battalion (Aqaba) (M113A2 MK1)
 Sharif Shaker bin Zaid 42nd Mechanized Infantry Battalion (Al-Karak) (M113A2 MK1)
 Sharif Naser bin Jamil 43rd Mechanized Infantry Battalion (Ma'an) (M113A2 MK1)
 3rd Field Air Defense Battalion (Shilka,Strela-10,Igla)
 Anti-Armor Company (Kornet-E)

Combat Support Units 
 3rd Field Air Defense Group
 Group HQ
 Signal Company
 84th Field Air Defense Battalion (Shilka, Igla)
 Command Engineer Battalion
 2 Mechanized Engineer Companies [1]
 General Support Company

Service Support Units 
 Supply and Transport Battalion
 2 Supply & Transport Companies [1] 
 Command Maintenance Group
 Medical Support Group 
 Administrative Transport Group

Command Training Center 
Notes:
  Each company supports a brigade or a group

Unit Summary

References 

Military units and formations of Jordan
Military units and formations established in 1970